Ingjald Olofsson was the son of Olof Trätälja and became the king of Värmland after his father's death, according to legend. When Ingjald died, his brother Halfdan Hvitbeinn made Värmland part of his kingdom.

Värmland
Norwegian petty kings
Ingjald Olofsson
Year of birth missing
Year of death missing